Womma railway station is located on the Gawler line. You can get to Womma Railway Station by Bus or Train. These are the lines and routes that have stops nearby -

Bus: 440, 452Train: GAWC

History

Womma opened in 1950.

It had a small building on the platform which consisted of a shelter, with a ticket office and toilets on either side, but they were demolished in the 1980s and early 1990s. Only the shelter remains. Passengers were required to access the station via a pedestrian underpass, but it has since been closed due to concerns of safety and vandalism. There are two low-level crossings for people to reach the station.

Services by platform

References

Railway stations in Adelaide
Railway stations in Australia opened in 1950